Cubalaskeya is a genus of minute sea snails, marine gastropod molluscs in the family Cerithiopsidae. This genus was described by Rolan and Fernandez-Garcés, in 2008.

Species
Species in the genus Cubalaskeya include:
 Cubalaskeya cubana Rolán & Fernández-Garcés, 2008
 Cubalaskeya machoi Espinosa, Ortea & Moro, 2008
 Cubalaskeya nivea (Faber, 2007)

References

Cerithiopsidae